Pedro Moreno (born September 14, 1980), is a Cuban actor and model. He lives in Miami with his wife and 3 children.

Career
He debuted on a reality show call Protagonistas de novela primera temporada, has worked in telenovelas such as Amor Descarado, La Mujer en el espejo, La viuda de blanco, among others. He was also named by People magazine as one of the 25 most beautiful Hispanic men.

In 2010, participates in the Sacrificio de Mujer telenovela of Venevision, playing Braulio Valdés.

In 2011, he joined the ranks of Televisa, was chosen for the Mexican soap opera Una familia con suerte of the hand of executive producer Juan Osorio. He acts as Enzo Rinaldi, father of Monica Rinaldi (Violeta Isfel).

In 2013 and 2019, participates in the dancing show "Mira Quien Baila" season 4 of Univision and in the telenovela "Cosita Linda" of Venevision acting as a villain named Olegario Pérez.

In 2014, he has a lead role in the telenovela "Voltea Pa' Que Te Enamores" as Rodrigo Karam. At the same year he works as host presenter in 8th season of "Nuestra Belleza Latina".

He returns to Televisa in 2015 for acting as lead role in telenovela "Amor de Barrio". In the 2016, he participates as lead role in telenovela "Tres veces Ana". Also he appeared on the movies "Jesus de Nazareth" and "La hora de Salvador Romero".

He joined the cast of telenovela "Me declare Culpable". Currently, he is in the Mexican version of the hit Broadway musical Chicago, playing the lead male character of Billy Flynn.

Filmography

Films

Theater

Television

Prizes & Awards

Prizes

Awards

References

External links 
 

1980 births
Living people
Cuban male models
Cuban male telenovela actors
Cuban emigrants to the United States